Aselliscus is a genus of bat in the family Hipposideridae. 
, it contains the following species:
 Stoliczka's trident bat (Aselliscus stoliczkanus)
 Temminck's trident bat (Aselliscus tricuspidatus)
 Dong Bac’s trident bat (Aselliscus dongbacana)

References

 
Bat genera
Taxa named by George Henry Hamilton Tate
Taxonomy articles created by Polbot